My Boss, My Teacher is a 2006 South Korean film and sequel to the 2001 film My Boss, My Hero. It was followed by The Mafia, The Salesman in 2007.

Plot 
Gangster Doo-shik has graduated school and is now attending college, though he is allowing his underling Sang-du to take classes on his behalf. For the final semester, all education majors are sent out to work in schools for teacher training. This is one job that Doo-shik must complete himself, and he is sent out to teach in the trouble-laden high school himself.

Cast 
 Jung Joon-ho ... Gae Doo-shik.
 Kim Sang-joong ... Oh Sang-jung
 Jung Woong-in ... Sang-du
 Jung Woon-taek ... Dae Ga-ri
 Kang Sung-pil
 Choi Yoon-yeong
 Han Hyo-joo
 Haha

Release 
My Boss, My Teacher was released in South Korea on 19 January 2006, and topped the box office on its opening weekend with 1,106,825 admissions. It held the number-one spot for a second consecutive week, and went on to receive a total of 6,105,431 admissions nationwide, making it the fourth best selling film of 2006, and—until surpassed by 200 Pounds Beauty in early 2007—the most successful Korean comedy film of all time. As of 5 February 2006, the film had grossed a total of $30,585,589.

References

External links 
 
 
 

2006 films
2000s Korean-language films
South Korean sequel films
South Korean comedy films
Films directed by Kim Dong-won (1962)
CJ Entertainment films
2000s South Korean films